Career Suicide is a Canadian hardcore punk band formed in 2001 in Toronto. The band's first live performance took place in January 2002, with first recorded output soon to follow.  The band has gone on to record several full-length albums and singles on various international labels.  The band has completed multiple tours of North America, Europe and Japan and continues to record and tour actively. Guitarist Jonah Falco and former bassist Mike Haliechuk also play drums and guitar, respectively, in the band Fucked Up. Career Suicide are known for having an old school 1980s hardcore sound.

Discography

Albums, EPs/Singles and Tapes
 1st demo tape (2002, self-released)
 2nd demo tape (2002, self-released)
 Career Suicide 7-inch EP (2002, Kangaroo Records)
 Career Suicide LP (2002, Ugly Pop Records)
 SARS 7-inch EP (2003, Deranged Records)
 Invisible Eyes 12-inch EP (2005, Feral Ward Records)
 Signals 7-inch EP (2004, Slasher Records)
 Signals 7-inch EP (European picture disk) (2004, Even Worse Records)
 Split LP w/ Jed Whitey (2004, Deranged Records)
 Attempted Suicide LP & CD (2006/2007, Deranged Records)
 Cherry Beach 7-inch EP (UK tour edition) (2008, Sewercide Records)
 Cherry Beach 7-inch EP (2010, Dirtnap Records)
 Machine Response 12-inch LP (2017, Static Shock Records)

Anthologies
 Anthology of Releases, 2001–2003 CD (2004, Kangaroo Records / Deranged Records)
 Anthology of Releases Vol. 2, 2003–2005 CD (2006, Deranged Records)

Current members 
 Jonah Falco – guitar
 Dallas Good - guitar
 Martin Farkas – vocals
 Jon Sharron – bass
 Ian Romano – drums

Past members 
 Eric Smith – drums
 Noah Gadke – bass
 Jesse Parker – drums
 Bennett Jones-Phillips – bass
 Chris Colohan – drums
 Mike Haliechuk – bass
 Mark Hurst – drums
 Neal (of Poland) – bass
 Mark Rodenheizer – bass
 Brandon Ferrell – drums (on Attempted Suicide LP) and 2nd guitar (live)
 David Brown - drums
 Matthew Miller - bass

References

External links
 Career Suicide official site
 Career Suicide at CBC Radio 3

Musical groups established in 2001
Musical groups from Toronto
Canadian hardcore punk groups
2001 establishments in Ontario